Taavi Aas (born 10 January 1966) is an Estonian politician. Former Minister of Economic Affairs and Infrastructure from 2019 to 2022 and Mayor of Tallinn, the capital of Estonia from 2017 to 2019. Before that, he served as the Acting Mayor of Tallinn since 30 September 2015 and Vice Mayor of Tallinn from April 2005. Aas has been the Chairman of Estonian Union of the Cities since 2010.

As the Vice Mayor, he coordinated the work of Tallinn City Planning Office and Tallinn Transportation Office, managing the reconstruction of Freedom Square (Vabaduse Väljak) and transition to free public transportation in Tallinn in 2013.

Aas became the Acting Mayor of Tallinn in September 2015 after the suspension of the duties of Mayor Edgar Savisaar by the Harju Land Court. In March 2017 Aas admitted he was ready to run as the candidate for Mayor of the ruling Center Party.

In the 2019 parliamentary election, Aas was elected into the Riigikogu, due to which he resigned as mayor. He was succeeded by Mihhail Kõlvart. On 29 April 2019, he was sworn in as the Minister of Economic Affairs and Infrastructure in Jüri Ratas' second cabinet.

References

1966 births
21st-century Estonian politicians
Estonian Centre Party politicians
Government ministers of Estonia
Living people
Mayors of Tallinn
Members of the Riigikogu, 2019–2023